This is a list of universities and colleges in the Brunei Darussalam. Full-fledged public and private universities and colleges are available across the country.

All public universities and colleges are given authorisation to award the students with their internal degree concentrations (qualifications) which are always accredited by the Brunei Darussalam National Accreditation Council (BDNAC).

The biggest awarding body in the country for both, public and private universities and colleges is Brunei Darussalam Technical and Vocational Education Council (BDTVEC).

Government institutions 

Note: IBTE was formerly known as Department of Technical Education (DTE), headquarters to all the seven vocational and technical institutes in Brunei.

Private institutions

References

Universities
Brunei
 
Brunei